Bangladesh–Haiti relations refer to the bilateral relations between Bangladesh and Haiti. The relations between the two countries have been largely influenced by the role of Bangladeshi peace keepers in Haiti. There have been some cultural exchanges between the two countries, mostly sports related.

Contribution of Bangladeshi peace keepers
Bangladeshi peace keepers are playing an active role in maintaining peace and stability in Haiti. Bangladeshi peace keepers in Haiti were first deployed in 2004 as part of United Nations Stabilization Mission in Haiti. In 2010, Haiti became the first country to receive all-female Bangladeshi police contingent. In 2012, officers of Bangladeshi police unit were awarded United Nations medal for their contribution in managing law enforcement in Haiti.

Humanitarian assistance
In the aftermath of 2010 Haiti earthquake, the Health ministry of Bangladesh government sent a medical team in Haiti consisting 20 doctors and 10 health technicians.

Cultural exchange
Haitian football players, such as Sony Norde and Pascal Millien, have played for Bangladeshi football clubs.

See also 
 Foreign relations of Bangladesh
 Foreign relations of Haiti

References

 
Haiti
Bilateral relations of Haiti